Yevgeni Aleksandrovich Natalich (born 5 July 1981) is a former Russian professional football player.

External links
 
 

1981 births
Living people
Russian footballers
Association football defenders
FC Slavyansk Slavyansk-na-Kubani players
FC Okean Nakhodka players
FC Sever Murmansk players
FC SKA Rostov-on-Don players
FC Slavia Mozyr players
FC Dynamo Stavropol players
Belarusian Premier League players
Russian expatriate footballers
Expatriate footballers in Belarus
FC Mashuk-KMV Pyatigorsk players